Buc Wheats was a boxed breakfast cereal produced by General Mills in the United States from 1971 until the early 1980s. The cereal consisted of toasted  wheat flakes (originally made with buckwheat) with a sweet maple-flavored glaze baked onto them. Late in its production, the maple glaze was replaced with a honey flavored glaze, which was derided by most customers; sales fell and General Mills  discontinued production of the cereal around 1983.

Nutritional value
According to the 1970s cereal boxes, Buc Wheats cereal was highly nutritious and contained 100% of the minimum daily requirements for vitamins and iron.

About
Buc Wheats cereal contained wheat flakes mixed with buckwheat and had the appearance of bran flakes, having a similar color and texture, but were lighter in weight. Buc Wheats was coated with a maple syrup glaze, giving it a unique flavor. Later in production, General Mills replaced the original maple glaze with a honey glaze. The new Buc Wheats were said to taste like a sweet and sticky bowl of Wheaties. Most consumers did not like the change.

Advertisement
In 1974 Steve Karmen, a New York City composer, produced a catchy little song for Buc Wheats titled, "Feelin' Like A Million Bucks".

References

General Mills cereals
Products introduced in 1971
1982 disestablishments